Meenal is an Indian actress who mainly appears in Tamil films. She has appeared in Cheran's Thavamai Thavamirundhu, Vetrimaran's Aadukalam, Thangar Bachan's Ammavin Kaipesi and Bharathiraja's Annakodi. She also acted as a female lead in a film called Veeran Maaran and co-starring by Rithik.

Filmography

References

External links

Living people
Indian film actresses
21st-century Indian actresses
Actresses in Tamil cinema
Actresses from Madurai
1985 births